Arnett may refer to the following places in the United States:

Arnett, Arkansas, an unincorporated community
Arnett, Kentucky, an unincorporated community
Arnett, Missouri, an unincorporated community
Arnett, Oklahoma, a town
Arnett, Harmon County, Oklahoma, an unincorporated community
Arnett, Braxton County, West Virginia, an unincorporated community
Arnett, Raleigh County, West Virginia, an unincorporated community